A teapot is a vessel used for steeping tea leaves or a herbal mix in boiling or near-boiling water, and for serving the resulting infusion which is called tea. It is one of the core components of teaware. Dry tea is available either in tea bags or as loose tea, in which case a tea infuser or tea strainer may be of some assistance, either to hold the leaves as they steep or to catch the leaves inside the teapot when the tea is poured. Teapots usually have an opening with a lid at their top, where the dry tea and hot water are added, a handle for holding by hand and a spout through which the tea is served. Some teapots have a strainer built-in on the inner edge of the spout. A small air hole in the lid is often created to stop the spout from dripping and splashing when tea is poured. In modern times, a thermally insulating cover called a tea cosy may be used to enhance the steeping process or to prevent the contents of the teapot from cooling too rapidly.

History

China 

The switch to specialized vessel for tea brewing was powered by the change from the powdered tea to leaf tea and from whipping to steeping that occurred in China. It is hard to exactly pinpoint the time of the invention of a teapot, since vessels in the shapes similar to the modern teapot were known in China since Neolithic period, but were initially used for water and wine, as boiling or whipping tea did not require a specialized container. When tea preparation switched to infusion (during the late Yuan dynasty), at first an ewer-like vessel were used for this purpose. Tea preparation during previous dynasties did not use a teapot. In the Tang dynasty, a cauldron was used to boil ground tea, which was served in bowls. Song dynasty tea was made by boiling water in a kettle then pouring the water into a bowl with finely ground tea leaves. A brush was then used to stir the tea. Written evidence of a teapot appears in the Yuan dynasty text Jiyuan Conghua, which describes a teapot that the author, Cai Shizhan, bought from the scholar Sun Daoming. By the Ming dynasty, teapots were widespread in China. There are early examples of teapots, like the ones made in Jun ware and the eight-lobed celadon pots of the Song-Yuan times, but an expert on Yixing ware, Kuei-Hsiang Lo, believes that the first teapots made especially for tea appeared around 1500 as copies of much earlier Yixing wine pots. The earliest example of such teapot that has survived to this day seems to be the one in the Flagstaff House Museum of Teaware; it has been dated to 1513 and is attributed to Gong Chun, the "father of Yixing teapot".

Early teapots, like those still used in modern Gongfu tea ceremony, are small by western standards meant for the individual consumption of tea. They use a higher ratio of leaves to water, which enables the brewer to control the variables of brewing to create several small infusions. After brewing, tea would then be decanted into a separate vessel, and distributed into the small cups of several drinkers, and brewed again. This allows the tea to be skillfully brewed, and for the flavor changes to be experienced through the various infusions.

Teapots made from pottery materials such as clay have been hand-fired for tens of thousands of years, originally in China. Clay is a popular material for teapots, as they tend to retain heat very well.

Many traditional Chinese teaware is yixing ware. Yixing and other regional clays are left unglazed. This allows the clay to absorb the flavor of the teas brewed over time, and enhance the flavor of the tea going forward. Some Gongfu practitioners designate their unglazed pots for specific types, sometimes even specific varietals of tea.

From the end of the 17th century tea was shipped from China to Europe as part of the export of exotic spices and luxury goods. The ships that brought the tea also carried porcelain teapots.
The majority of these teapots were painted in blue and white underglaze.
Porcelain, being completely vitrified, will withstand sea water without damage, so the teapots were packed below deck whilst the tea was stowed above deck to ensure that it remained dry.

Japan 

Yixing teapots became very popular in Japan, with the Banko ware in particular being a close copy of the Chinese originals. The most significant improvements were the refinements of the shape and the extensive use of the "overhead" handle that makes carrying of the teapot easier.

Tibet 

Teapots for butter tea in Tibet were evolving simultaneously with teapots of China, eventually settling on a pitcher-like shape.

Europe 

The Yixing teapots came to Europe with the tea and became known as boccarro  ("large mouth" in Portuguese). The Chinese teapot models were used, since the preservation of the Chinese way of drinking was considered to be essential. Porcelain teapots were particularly desirable because porcelain could not be made in Europe at that time, and tea drinking in Europe was initially the preserve of the upper classes. European teapots at the time were made of silver, with the earliest preserved English one, at the Victoria and Albert Museum, dated 1670. At the same time, the production of the copies of the Chinese earthenware teapots started (Fulham Pottery in London was manufacturing these already in 1670). It wasn't until 1708 that the first successful experiments by von Tschirnhaus enabled Böttger, and the  Meissen factory in Dresden started the operation in 1710 and produced good copies of Japanese Kakiemon and Imari porcelain.
When European potteries in Holland, Germany, and England began to make their own tea wares they at first imitated the Chinese bocarro designs. Many English potteries, however, decided not to risk money on the new material, and continued the manufacturing of earthenware and stoneware pots; the famed creamware services made in Staffordshire reached popularity in the second half of the 18th century.

At the turn of 18th century, design and decoration of the European teapot started to deviate from the Chinese tradition, with the pear shape, or  being the first major novation. An early English pyriform teapot dates back to 1690, the shape became widespread at the time of Queen Anne and remains in vogue since then. The other popular shapes in the 18th century were "globular" (sphere-like vessel on a raised foot) and a vase (or urn, Louis XV style), with the latter being a rare comeback to the wine-pot origins of a teapot.

In the last half of the 18th century, English factories introduced the matched sets of teaware. The original demand for "China" porcelain tea sets was eventually replaced, at least among the wealthy, with enthusiasm for silver pieces that were extensively produced by the end of the reign of George III. For the less affluent, pewter sets were made, mostly as simplified copies of the silver pieces.

America 
In colonial America, Boston became the epicenter for silver production and artistry. Among the many artists in Boston there were four major families in the city's silver market: Edwards, Revere, Burt and Hurd. Their works of art included silver teapots. Two new "Colonial" shapes appeared in the late Georgian period: oval and octagonal teapots with flat bases, plain handles in the shape of C, and, frequently, straight tapering spouts.

Heat retention 
Ability of a teapot to keep heat depends on the material, for example, stoneware is supposed to keep the heat better than porcelain.

To keep teapots hot after tea is first brewed, English households since 18th century employed the tea cosy, a padded fabric covering, much like a hat, that slips over the tea pot. The tea cosy got very popular in the 20th century as a practical and decorative object in the kitchen.

Features 
Teapots evolved from the designs where the lid was resting in a recess of the body of the vessel to the lid sitting on top of the body, and then to the modern design with the deep flanges of the lid preventing it from falling out.

When the tea is being poured out, outside air needs to enter the body of the teapot; therefore design involves either a loosely fitting lid or a vent hole at the top of the pot, usually in the lid.

The built-in strainer at the base of the spout got borrowed from coffeepots that in turn get this feature from the vessels designed for other liquids (the earliest known built-in strainer dates back to 1300 BC).

The coffee drip brew and coffee percolator were invented in the beginning of the 19th century, similar designs for tea were developed soon after that.

Modern infusers originated in 1817, when an English patent was granted for a "tea or coffee biggin", a metal basket that sat at the bottom of the teapot. Many more tea leaf holder designs had followed, with tea ball and tea-making spoon arriving in the first half of the 19th century.

The first automated electric teapot was invented in 1909.

Materials 
The typical materials used for teapots have been stoneware (Yixing), porcelain, silver and gold. 

Teapots made of tin arrived around 1700, allowing for a very low-cost designs. At the same time the use of  britanniaware had started. Nickel plating was introduced in the second half of the 19th century. Teapots from earthenware were produced in Staffordshire from 1720 to 1780, with curious shapes (animals, houses, etc.) made possible by using molds (and not the throwing wheel). Enamelware was in wide use at the end of the 19th century.

In the 20th century, use of aluminum became popular. Arrival of the heatproof glass made a glass teapot possible, with the first "Teaket" design manufactured in 1932.

Dribbling 

One phenomenon that occurs with some teapots is that of dribbling where the flow runs down the outside of the spout particularly as the flow starts or stops. Different explanations for this phenomenon have been proposed at various times. Making the external surface of the spout more hydrophobic, and reducing the radius of curvature of the inside of the tip so that the flow detaches cleanly can avoid dribbling.

The Moroccan teapot 

In Morocco, stainless steel teapots are an essential to make Moroccan mint tea. Moroccan teapots are heat resistant and can be put directly on the stove. With colorful tea glasses, they are part of the Moroccan tea ritual. The tea is considered to be drinkable only when it has foam on top. Teapots have a long curved spout in order to pour tea from a height of 12 inches above the glasses, which produces foam on the surface of the tea. Their designs can go from minimalistic to heavily decorated.

Chocolate teapot
A chocolate teapot is a teapot that would be made from chocolate. It is commonly supposed that such a teapot would melt, and be impossible to use, therefore the term is often used as an analogy for any useless item.

Experimental researchers in 2001 did indeed fail to successfully use a chocolate teapot they had made. Later research, however, by The Naked Scientists in 2008, showed that such a teapot could be used to make tea, provided that the walls of the teapot were more than one centimetre thick. Re-usable (for a limited number of times) pots are now easily available online.

In non-teamaking contexts

A teapot has a rather distinctive shape, and its fame may sometimes have little to do with its primary function.
The Utah Teapot is a standard reference object of the computer graphics community, comparable to Hello, World for its popularity. It is included as a graphics primitive in many graphics packages, including AutoCAD, POV-Ray, OpenGL, Direct3D, and 3ds Max.
Russell's teapot, is an analogy, devised by Bertrand Russell, which attacks the unfalsifiability of religious claims, comparing them to the eponymous teapot. The concept in turn inspired the title of the 1973 album Flying Teapot by the Franco-British rock band Gong.
The teapot has been featured in the American children's song from 1939, "I'm a Little Teapot".
In Korea, the teapot is commonly used as a serving container for various types of wines.
Part of the constellation of Sagittarius contains an asterism (or a star pattern not officially recognized as a constellation) that famously resembles a teapot.
The 'Teapot Game' is a word game described by Mary White's Book of Games, and involves guessing a word which is replaced by "teapot" in various sentences.
The Teapot is a tale by Hans Christian Andersen.

In architecture
 In 2004, a Malaysian cult called the Sky Kingdom constructed a 35 foot tall, cream colored teapot, with an unusually long spout, higher than the pot itself on its property as part of its own private symbolism which included a similarly large blue vase next to the teapot. As part of a crackdown on the sect in August 2005 bulldozers and heavy machinery were sent in to tear down the structure.
 The (purported) world's largest architectural teapot is to be found in West Virginia. In 1938 The Chester teapot was constructed by William "Babe" Devon. The Teapot started its life as a gigantic wooden hogshead barrel for a Hires Root Beer advertising campaign. Devon purchased the barrel in Pennsylvania and had it shipped to Chester, WV where it was set up at the junction of State Route 2 and U.S. Route 30. A spout and handle were added at this time and the wooden barrel was covered with tin to form the teapot's shape. A large glass ball was placed on top to make the knob of the "lid". The Teapot stood in front of Devon's pottery outlet store. Local teenagers were hired to run a concession and souvenir stand which was set up inside the Teapot.
 The Teapot Dome Service Station is located in Zillah, Washington.  It was built in 1922, and the 15-foot handled-and-spouted gas station was designed as a visual pun referencing the then-current Teapot Dome scandal.  It has been moved multiple times and is no longer an active gas station.

See also

 Brown Betty, a type of British teapot made from a red clay, known for being rotund and glazed with brown manganese 
 Briq, a teapot and pitcher traditionally used by Lebanese and Syrian Arabs
 Cube teapot, a ruggedized teapot invented for use on ships
 ISO 3103, a description of a standardised method of brewing tea from the International Organization for Standardization
 I'm a Little Teapot, a children's song
 I'm a teapot, HTTP error 418
 Kettle, types of vessels specialized for boiling and pouring plain water, often metal, also with a spout, sometimes electric
 Kyūsu, a Japanese ceramic teapot, often with a side handle
Operation Teapot, a series of fourteen nuclear test explosions conducted at the Nevada Test Site in the first half of 1955
Pot-holder
 Samovar, a heated metal container traditionally used to boil water for tea in and around Russia, as well as in other Slavic nations, Iran and Turkey
 Slop bowl part of a tea set - a bowl to empty tea cups of cooled tea and dregs before refilling with fresh tea
 Sparta Teapot Museum, formerly in Sparta, North Carolina, USA
 Teacup, a small cup with or without a handle, from which to drink tea
 Tealight, a small candle originally used to keep a teapot warm
 Tea set, a usually matching set of dishes including a teapot, small pitcher for milk and sugar bowl, for serving tea in a formal manner

Teapot Rock, a rock formation in Wyoming
 Tetsubin, Japanese cast iron pot with a spout
 Utah teapot, a 3D model of a teapot frequently used as a reference object in computer graphics
 Yixing clay teapot, a special Chinese clay teapot
The pot calling the kettle black, idiom

References

Sources

Further reading
Steve Woodhead, "The Teapot Book" A.&C. Black, 2005 .
Robin Emmerson, "British Teapots and Tea Drinking" HMSO, 1992 
Garth Clark "The Artful Teapot" Thames and Hudson 
Edward Bramah "Novelty Teapots" Quiller Press

External links

A brief history of teapots from Stoke-on-Trent Museums
English Teapots – Their Origin and Variety
Teapots at the British Museum
Teapots at the Metropolitan Museum of Art
Teapots at the University of Michigan Museum of Art
Teapots at the Cooper Hewitt, Smithsonian Design Museum
The Utah Teapot at the Computer History Museum

 
Chinese inventions
Liquid containers
Pottery shapes
Yuan dynasty